Piechowice  is a town in Karkonosze County, Lower Silesian Voivodeship, in south-western Poland.

, the town has a population of 6,194.

Twin towns – sister cities

Piechowice is twinned with:
 Úpice, Czech Republic

References

Cities and towns in Lower Silesian Voivodeship
Karkonosze County
Cities in Silesia